Monticello Seminary (also Monticello Female Seminary), founded in 1835, was an American seminary, junior college and academy in Godfrey, Illinois. The  campus was the oldest female seminary in the west, before it closed in 1971. The buildings are now part of Lewis and Clark Community College.

History

The school was founded by Captain Benjamin Godfrey. He was an elder in the Presbyterian church of Alton, Illinois and interested in the cause of Christian education. Noting the predominating influence of the mother on the child, he saw that the higher education of women made them better trainers and teachers of their children. With this thought as the keynote of his reflections, he determined to erect a seminary to be devoted, as he phrased it, “to the moral, intellectual and domestic improvement of females."

He thereupon erected, at a cost of US$53,000, a spacious edifice in a beautiful grove on his lands at Godfrey, which he placed in charge of a self-perpetuating board of trustees. The original building was commenced February 20, 1835. The seminary was opened and classes organized April 14, 1838. A charter was granted by the state of Illinois to Monticello Female Seminary in 1840. The first class was graduated in June, 1841. The original buildings were destroyed by fire November 4, 1888. A temporary building was promptly erected and occupied from January, 1889, to June, 1890. The corner stone of the new building was laid June 11, 1889, and building dedicated June 10, 1890.

The first head of the institution was Rev. Dr. Theron Baldwin, a native of Connecticut, a graduate of Yale University. After five years of service, from 1838 to 1843, he was succeeded by Philena Fobes. She was succeeded in 1867 by Harriet Newell Haskell, a member of a distinguished New England family, and one of the remarkable women of her generation. Catherine Burrowes, of the faculty, succeeded Haskell for the next two years as acting principal, declining permanent appointment. Martina C. Erickson, having been elected permanent principal, assumed her new duties in September, 1910. She was formerly dean of the ladies' department of the Indiana State Normal School.

Architecture and fittings

The original building at Monticello was of stone, with four stories including basement. A fifth story was added in 1854 and a south wing . When the buildings and equipment were destroyed by fire the property loss was $350,000. The new buildings, far more spacious than the old, were constructed of Corydon, Bedford and Alton stone. The building was heated by hot water, lighted by gas, wired for electricity, and provided with elevator service from basement to upper floor. The buildings were fire proof. The groves, lawns and spacious campus of Monticello were of unrivaled attractiveness.

Notable people
 Emily Gilmore Alden (1834–1914), educator at Monticello Seminary for 40 years
 Carrie Thomas Alexander-Bahrenberg, valedictorian, class of 1880
 Carolyn T. Foreman, known then as Carolyn Thomas, later married Oklahoma lawyer and historian Grant Foreman. She became a notable historian in her own right.
 Lucy Larcom, teacher, poet, and writer.
 Ruth Bryan Owen, U.S.Representative from Florida and Ambassador to Denmark

References

Attribution

Bibliography

External links

Educational institutions established in 1835
Schools in Madison County, Illinois
Defunct schools in Illinois
Defunct girls' schools in the United States
1835 establishments in Illinois
Educational institutions disestablished in 1971
1971 disestablishments in Illinois
Girls' schools in Illinois